Little Trinity Anglican Church (officially Trinity East) is a parish church of the Anglican Church of Canada. It is located at 425 King Street East in the Corktown neighbourhood, just east of downtown Toronto, Ontario, Canada. An Ontario Heritage Trust plaque at the site notes that the 1844 church is the oldest surviving church in the city.

History
The cornerstone for the Gothic Revival church was laid on July 20, 1843, and the first services were held in February 1844, making it the oldest surviving church building in Toronto. It was the second Anglican church in the city, after St. James' Cathedral. The church is so named to distinguish it from the later Church of the Holy Trinity.

The architect was 25-year-old Henry Bowyer Lane, who had recently immigrated from England.  The structure is red brick with accents of tan brick and stone.  Local craftsmen donated many of the bricks and their labor to construct the church.  The  square bell tower has contrasting octagonal buttresses at each of its four corners.

The congregation was established in eastern Toronto on July 12, 1842, for working-class families unable to pay the high pew prices at St. James', and so they built a church for all people. Little Trinity has always been a church whose life is rooted in the word of God, the Holy Bible – it is an Evangelical Anglican church. For about 100 years, from the 1890s, the motto of the church was "holding forth the word of life" (Phillipians 2:14).

In 1889, the church was enlarged to provide 600 seats for the congregation. Part of the addition was destroyed by fire in early 1961. After 14-months of reconstruction, the congregation returned in March 1962. During this renovation, the floor of the nave was raised  to allow for construction of an activity hall on the lower level.

Little Trinity has sent dozens of church members overseas to serve the development and spiritual needs of nations around the world.

In 2014, a new office space was opened at 403 King Street East, in a revitalized heritage building. The present multi-generational congregation is made up of members of many backgrounds from across the Toronto region. There is a Sunday School programme and a youth programme. Each week, worship services are held on Sunday morning and Sunday evening.

Gallery

See also 
 List of oldest buildings and structures in Toronto
 List of Anglican churches in Toronto

References 

 McHugh, Patricia. Toronto Architecture. Toronto: McClelland & Stewart, 1989.

External links 

 

1844 establishments in Canada
Anglican church buildings in Toronto
19th-century Anglican church buildings in Canada
Gothic Revival architecture in Toronto
Gothic Revival church buildings in Canada